Oneonta City School District is a school district in Blount County, Alabama.

References

External links
 

Education in Blount County, Alabama